Ryan Guettler (born 17 July 1983) is a BMX Dirt and Freestyle rider from Beenleigh, Australia. Making his international debut at the 2001 Asian X Games alongside Colin MacKay and Jesse Boughton, Guettler won a silver medal, Colin won a bronze medal and Jesse took the gold. Ryan used his winnings to make his U.S. debut with Vans the next year, shortly after a showing in the Global X Games, where he represented Australia.

Becoming a regular on the BMX circuit in 2004, Guettler placed 1st in the Vans Triple Crown series in Dirt, and 4th in Street. Guettler has, for the most part, sustained his success, competing most notably in the 2005 and 2006 AST Dew Tours. In 2005 he swept Dew Cups in both of his competing disciplines, dirt and park; however, he was not able to carry over his successes from 2005 to 2006, mostly due to injuries he sustained early in the season. Ryan participates in local contests as well as global contests, such as the Heavy Metal Heroes in Beenleigh. He is also a close friend to Santiago Giraldo.

He has also released a signature bike from MirraCo., called "The Black Pearl", and designed a pair of Vans shoes.

Contest history 

2004
3rd BMX Park, X Games
2005
3rd BMX Dirt, X Games
1st BMX Park, 2005 AST Dew Tour
1st BMX Park, Panasonic Open, AST Dew Tour.
1st BMX Park, Right Guard Open, AST Dew Tour
3rd BMX Park, Vans Invitational, AST Dew Tour
5th BMX Park, Toyota Challenge, AST Dew Tour
3rd BMX Park, PlayStation Pro, AST Dew Tour
1st BMX Dirt, 2005 AST Dew Tour
10th BMX Dirt, Panasonic Open, AST Dew Tour
1st BMX Dirt, Right Guard Open, AST Dew Tour
1st BMX Dirt, Vans Invitational, AST Dew Tour
1st BMX Dirt, Toyota Challenge, AST Dew Tour
2nd BMX Dirt, PlayStation Pro, AST Dew Tour
2006
2nd BMX Park, Panasonic Open, AST Dew Tour
6th BMX Dirt, Right Guard Open, AST Dew Tour
1st BMX Dirt, Toyota Challenge, AST Dew Tour
2007
1st Dirt, BMX Games
2nd Park, BMX Games
1st Mini, BMX Games
2nd BMX Park, AST Dew Tour's Toyota Challenge

Ryan Guettler took part in Season 3 of BMX P.I.G for team. His partner in this was Dave Dillewaard. They got to the finals but lost out to Morgan Wade and his teammate.

See also

References

External links
 Official Ryan Guettler Site
 Online photo-biography

Australian male cyclists
BMX riders
1983 births
Living people
Cyclists from Queensland